In the reign of Ordoño I of Asturias (850–866), the kingdom began to be known as that of León.  In 910, an independent Kingdom of León was founded when the king of Asturias divided his territory amongst his three sons.

Below follows a list of Leonese monarchs.  It is, in part, a continuation of the list of Asturian monarchs.

Kings of León

Astur-Leonese dynasty

Jiménez Dynasty

House of Burgundy
The follow dynasts are descendants, in the male line, of Urraca's husband, Raymond of Burgundy.

House of Trastámara
Henry II was the illegitimate son of Alfonso XI.  He was made duke of Trastámara.

House of Habsburg

Family tree
The colors denotes the monarchs from the:

 - Astur-Leonese Dynasty;  - Jiménez dynasty;  -House of Burgundy

——  The solid lines denote the legitimate descents

– – – - The dashed lines denote a marriage 

· · · · The dotted lines denote the liaisons and illegitimate descendants

See also
List of Spanish monarchs
Kings of Spain family tree
Kingdom of León
Lists of incumbents

Further reading
Barton, Simon. The Aristocracy in Twelfth-Century León and Castile. Cambridge University Press, 1997. Appendix I: "The Counts of Twelfth Century León and Castile", pp. 235–302.

 
Leon